Parachalciope is a genus of moths of the family Erebidae. The genus was erected by George Hampson in 1913.

Species
Parachalciope agonia Hampson, 1913
Parachalciope albifissa (Hampson, 1910)
Parachalciope benitensis (Holland, 1894)
Parachalciope binaria (Holland, 1894)
Parachalciope deltifera (Felder & Rogenhofer, 1874)
Parachalciope emiplaneta Berio, 1954
Parachalciope euclidicola (Walker, 1858) (syn: Parachalciope furcifera (Hampson, 1902))
Parachalciope inornata (Holland, 1894)
Parachalciope longiplaga Hampson, 1913
Parachalciope mahura (Felder & Rogenhofer, 1874) (syn: Parachalciope ditrigona (Hampson, 1910))
Parachalciope mixta Rothschild, 1921
Parachalciope monoplaneta Hampson, 1913
Parachalciope rotundata Gaede, 1936
Parachalciope trigonometrica Hampson, 1913

References

Catocalinae